Nam Phong may refer to the following places in Thailand:

Nam Phong district, Khon Kaen province, and a municipality in that district
Royal Thai Air Base Nam Phong
Nam Phong National Park, close to, but not in, Nam Phong district, and named for Nam Phong river